Girgensohnia bungeana is a species of flowering plant belonging to the family Amaranthaceae.

It is native to Iran to Central Asia.

References

Amaranthaceae